Tyra Field is the largest gas condensate field in the Danish Sector of the North Sea. It was discovered in 1968 and production started in 1984. The field is owned by Dansk Undergrunds Consortium, a partnership between Total, Noreco and Nordsofonden, and operated by Total.

History
In August 2017 Maersk Oil was sold to Total S.A. with the takeover completed in 2018.

Facilities
The Tyra Field has two production complexes named Tyra West and Tyra East, connected by pipelines. Tyra West includes oil and gas processing plants which in addition to the gas produced at the Tyra field, processes also gas from Halfdan and Valdemar fields. The complex consists of two wellhead platforms, one processing and accommodation platform, and one gas flare stack. Tyra East processes also oil and gas from Valdemar, Roar, Svend, Tyra Southeast, Harald, Lulita, Gorm and Dan oil fields. It consists of two wellhead platforms, one processing and accommodation platform, one gas flare stack, and one riser platform.

The installations developed for the Tyra field were:

In total, the field has 20 gas-producing wells, and 28 oil and gas-producing wells.

Fluids from the drilling & wellhead platforms are routed to an inlet three phase inlet separator on the ‘A’ processing platforms. The separator separated the fluids into gas, condensate and produced water. Gas undergoes water dehydration through contact with glycol. On TCP-A the gas is comingled with gas from Gorm, Dan and Tyra West. The combined gas stream is chilled to achieve a hydrocarbon dewpoint. The gas is compressed from 1000 to 2000 psi (pounds-force per square inch) in 5 Ruston TB5000 gas turbine driven gas compressors (24,500 brake horse power total), and is fiscally metered before export onshore to Jutland.

Condensate from the inlet separator is routed to a coalescer after which it is comingled with condensate from Tyra West. The combined stream is routed successively through a 1st stage, 2nd stage and 3rd stage separators operating at successively lower pressures. Gas from the 2nd and 3rd stage separators is compressed and joins the gas from the 1st stage separator and is routed into the inlet separator. Condensate from the 3rd stage separator is fiscally metered and is exported onshore via the Gorm installation. The design export rate is 20,000 barrels/day.

Produced water from the inlet separator is treated to remove and condensate and is discharged overboard.

Produced oil is transported to the Gorm E riser platform in the Gorm field, and further through the subsea pipeline to the oil terminal in Fredericia, Denmark. Produced natural gas is transported from the Tyra East riser platform to Nybro Gas Processing Plant, Denmark, and from Tyra West riser platform to the Netherlands through the Tyra West – F3 and NOGAT pipelines.

Redevelopment project
Due to the production facilities having sunk 6m Maersk Oil announced on 1 December 2017 Maersk Oil the redevelopment of Tyra Field, which would mean decommissioning the 35 year old facilities and installing new ones. The living and processing platform on Tyra East and Tyra West will be scrapped. One new living platform and one new processing platform will be built. The living quarter platform will be constructed by Italian EPC contractor Rosetti marino, while processing platform will be constructed in Kuala Lumpur by American EPC contractor McDermott International.

In July 2018 Modern American Recycling Services based in Frederikshavn secured a contract to scrap the two platforms.

Up until the temporary closure in September 2019, the Tyra field processed 90% of all gas produced in the Danish part of the North Sea.

The decommission project is estimated to cost 4 Billion DKK and the new facilities will cost 17 Billion DKK. All in all the project is expected use 1.3 million working hours.

The new facilities were planned to be ready for production in July 2022, but this was postponed to July 2023 due to the COVID-19 pandemic.

See also 

 Gorm Field
 Dan oil field

References

Natural gas fields in Denmark
North Sea energy
Maersk Oil
Shell plc oil and gas fields
Chevron Corporation oil and gas fields